Azupiranu (𒌑𒄯𒊕 / Šamḫurrēšu) was a town in ancient Mesopotamia. The exact location is unknown. In a Neo-Assyrian text purporting to be the autobiography of Sargon of Akkad, Azupiranu is named as Sargon's birthplace and described as "situated on the banks of the Euphrates." 
Azupiranu is an Akkadian name meaning "city of saffron".

Notes

Akkadian cities
Former populated places in Iraq